Brandon Williams may refer to:

Brandon Williams (basketball, born 1975), American former basketball player
Brandon Williams (basketball, born 1999), American active basketball player
Brandon Williams (cornerback, born 1980), former American football cornerback
Brandon Williams (cornerback, born 1992), American football cornerback for the Arizona Cardinals
Brandon Williams (wide receiver) (born 1984), former American football wide receiver
Brandon Williams (tight end) (born 1987), American football tight end for the Miami Dolphins
Brandon Williams (linebacker) (born 1988), former American football linebacker
Brandon Williams (cricketer) (born 1989), South African cricketer
Brandon Williams (defensive tackle) (born 1989), American football defensive tackle for the Baltimore Ravens
Brandon Williams (footballer) (born 2000), English association football (soccer) player
Brandon Williams (politician) (born 1967), American politician
Brandon Williams (born 1984), American rhythm and blues singer, known professionally as Urban Mystic

See also
Brandon Rhys-Williams (1927–1988), British Conservative politician